This is a chronological list of selected television programmes and feature films produced or co-produced by the BBC Studios Natural History Unit since its inception in 1957. It is not intended to be exhaustive given the large amount of material the Unit has produced in its history, but it does capture all the major TV series and films for which it has gained recognition. A brief synopsis of pre-1957 radio and television programmes on a natural history theme made by the BBC is given in the History section of the main BBC Studios Natural History Unit article.

Television productions

Single-running television productions

Long-running television productions

Feature film productions

See also
Nature documentary
BBC Atlas of the Natural World, a 2006-07 DVD compilation series for North America

Notes

References

The material for this article has largely been drawn from the following sources:
 Parsons, C. (1982) True to Nature: 25 Years of Wildlife Filming with the BBC Natural History Unit. Patrick Stephens Limited. 
 BBC/2entertain Great Wildlife Moments DVD (2003). Bonus Feature: NHU Filmography
 BBC TV programmes website, searchable by title or category
 BBC Science & Nature: TV & Radio Follow-up (not updated since 2008)

Lists of films by studio